Jake Ford (April 29, 1946 – May 19, 1996) was a point guard who played in the National Basketball Association. He was drafted in the second round of the 1970 NBA draft by the Seattle SuperSonics and would play two seasons with the team. Previously he was also drafted by the Cincinnati Royals in the fifth round in 1969.

References

1946 births
1996 deaths
American men's basketball players
Basketball players from South Carolina
Cincinnati Royals draft picks
Maryland Eastern Shore Hawks men's basketball players
People from Georgetown, South Carolina
Point guards
Seattle SuperSonics draft picks
Seattle SuperSonics players